Karlstadt (Main) station is a railway station in the municipality of Karlstadt am Main, located in the Main-Spessart district in Bavaria, Germany.

References

Railway stations in Bavaria
Main-Spessart